A bolillo (in Mexico) or pan francés (in Central America) (meaning "French bread") is a type of savory bread made in Mexico and Central America. It is a variation of the baguette, but shorter in length and is often baked in a stone oven. Brought to Mexico City in the 1860s by Emperor Maximilian's troupe of cooks, its use quickly spread throughout the country.

It is the main ingredient for tortas and molletes. It has a slash on top made with a slashing tool or bread lame, which permits the exhaust of steam and the expansion of bread without stressing its skin. A variation of the bolillo is the 'telera', which is very similar, but in this case, is usually softer and as a current trend sweeter. Other variations include bolillos made of alternate ingredients such as whole wheat, wheat germ, or flax.

Names

The bolillo is a variation of the baguette, and thus often has names in the local language reflecting this. In Guadalajara and Sonora, they are called birotes which are often made with sourdough. In northern Mexico, they are known both as bolillos and pan blanco, whereas in northeast Mexico it is known as pan francés. In Sinaloa, they are called torcido and birote. In Central America, especially in El Salvador, it is also known as pan francés and in Guatemala it is known as pirujo. In Panama, a similar but longer type of bread is known as flauta (flute) while pan francés refers to the thinner, crustier French baguette. In Brazil, a similar bread is made and known as pão francês or pão de sal ("bread of salt"). In the Philippines, another similar baguette-derived bread is known as pan de sal (also "bread of salt").

Uses 
The bolillo is the typical bun used for Sonoran hot dogs.

References

Cuisine of the Southwestern United States
Mexican breads
Mexican slang
Salvadoran cuisine
Spanish slang